Baden was a state of the Holy Roman Empire and later one of the German states along the frontier with France primarily consisting of territory along the right bank of the Rhine opposite Alsace and the Palatinate.

Margravine of Baden (incomplete)

Baden divided

Margravine of Baden-Baden, 1190–1335

Margravine of Baden-Hachberg, 1190–1418 (incomplete)

Margravine of Baden-Sausenberg, 1290–1503

Margravine of Baden-Eberstein, 1291–1353

Margravine of Baden-Pforzheim, 1291–1361

Margravine of Baden-Baden, 1348–1588

Margravine of Baden-Durlach, 1515–1771

Margravine of Baden-Sponheim, 1515–1533

Margravine of Baden-Rodemachern, 1536–1596

Margravine of Baden-Rodenheim, 1575–1620 (incomplete)

Margravine of Baden-Hachberg, 1577–1591

Margravine of Baden-Sausenberg, 1577–1604

Margravine of Baden-Rodemachern, 1622–1666

Margravine of Baden-Baden, 1622–1771

Margravine of Baden

Electress of Baden
None

Grand Duchess of Baden

Titular Grand Duchess of Baden

References 
 Baden index pag
 Baden

 
 
 
Baden
Baden